"Champagne Night" is a song recorded by American country music trio Lady A (then known as Lady Antebellum). It was released on April 13, 2020, following the group's appearance on an episode of the television series Songland. "Champagne Night" is a re-worked version of the song "I'll Drink to That" by Madeline Merlo, with additional writing from the group members and its producer, Shane McAnally. This is the final single released under the name Lady Antebellum, before the band changed to Lady A, in June 2020. "Champagne Night" was included on the digital only deluxe edition re-issue of the trio's eighth studio album, Ocean.

Background
Lady A appeared on the first episode of the second season of American songwriting competition series, Songland, which aired April 13, 2020. Canadian singer-songwriter Madeline Merlo presented the episode's winning song, "I'll Drink to That", which she co-wrote with Tina Parol, David Thomson, Patricia Conroy. After opting to record the song, the members of Lady A made adjustments to the lyrics with its producer, Shane McAnally, and the title was changed to "Champagne Night". Following its digital release alongside the airing of the episode, the song hit number one on the American iTunes all-genre sales chart and remained in the top ten the following week. On April 20, 2020, the group released the song to country radio. This made "Champagne Night" the first winning song from Songland to be promoted as an official radio single.

Accolades

Live performances
On May 11, 2020, Lady A performed "Champagne Night" for the first time in at home edition of The Tonight Show Starring Jimmy Fallon. Another at-home performance of the song was broadcast during the Season 18 finale of The Voice on May 19, 2020. On June 3, they played the song in a television special CMT Celebrates Our Heroes: An Artists of the Year.

Charts

Weekly charts

Year-end charts

Certifications

Release history

References

2020 songs
2020 singles
Lady A songs
Big Machine Records singles
Songs written by Shane McAnally
Songs written by Hillary Scott
Songs written by Charles Kelley
Songs written by Dave Haywood
Songs written by Patricia Conroy
Songs written by Madeline Merlo
Songs written by Dave Thomson (musician)